Open GDF Suez, formerly Open Gaz de France, was a Premier level tennis tournament on the WTA Tour held in Paris, France. Held from 1993 till 2014, the tournament was played indoors, originally on carpet until 2000, then on hardcourts. The 2014 Open GDF Suez was the last edition.

Amélie Mauresmo holds the record for the most singles titles with three in 2001, 2006 and 2009.

Past finals

Singles

Doubles

See also
 Clarins Open, predecessor (1987–92)
 List of tennis tournaments

External links

Official website

 
Tennis tournaments in France
Indoor tennis tournaments
Hard court tennis tournaments
WTA Tour
Tennis in Paris
Engie
Defunct tennis tournaments in France